Steven J. Lund is an engineer and American politician serving as a member of the Utah House of Representatives from the 58th district. He is a member of the Republican Party.

Early life and education

Lund attended and graduated from Manti High School and received he BS Degree in Petroleum Engineering from the New Mexico Institute of Mining and Technology.

Political career 

Prior to his service in the Utah State legislature, Lund served as a Sanpete County Commissioner. In 2020, Lund ran for State Representative and won with 84.6% of the vote. He is currently running for his second consecutive term.

In the 2022 legislative session, Lund served on the Business, Economic Development, and Labor Appropriations Subcommittee, House Economic Development and Workforce Services Committee, and the House Public Utilities, Energy, and Technology Committee.

2022 sponsored legislation

References 

Year of birth missing (living people)
Living people
County commissioners in Utah
Republican Party members of the Utah House of Representatives
People from Mount Pleasant, Utah
21st-century American politicians
New Mexico Institute of Mining and Technology alumni